NHL Hitz is a series of video games:
 NHL Hitz 2002 (2001)
 NHL Hitz 2003 (2002)
 NHL Hitz Pro (2003)